Jach'a Jipiña (Aymara jach'a big, jipiña squatting of animals, 'big place where the animals crouch' or  'big resting place of animals', Hispanicized spelling Jachcha Jipina) is a  mountain in the Cordillera Real in the Andes of Bolivia. It is situated in the La Paz Department, Los Andes Province, Pucarani Municipality. Jach'a Jipiña lies south-west of the lake Juri Quta.

See also 
 Qullpani

References 

Mountains of La Paz Department (Bolivia)